Peter Hubert Evermode Backx (1805–1868) was a 19th-century abbot of Tongerlo Abbey, in Belgium.

References

External links
 Catholic Encyclopedia article

1805 births
1868 deaths
Belgian abbots
People from Westerlo